The Lake Koocanusa Scenic Byway is a  scenic highway in Lincoln County, Montana, USA, following the Kootenai River and the eastern shore of Lake Koocanusa on Highway 37. The road starts in Libby and proceeds north to Eureka. Lake Koocanusa is formed behind Libby Dam and has a visitors center nearby. The Kootenai River and Lake Koocanusa cut a narrow fjord-like gorge between the Purcell Mountains and the Salish Mountains. The byway is a popular route for visitors visiting the Kootenai National Forest. Snow removal crews work to keep the route open during the winter season. Lodging and services are available in Libby and Eureka.

References 
 Lincoln County Chamber of Commerce.

Koocanusa
U.S. Highways in Montana
Kootenai National Forest
National Scenic Byways